The Semarang Section ABC Toll Road is a part of Trans-Java toll road that connects around areas of Semarang, capital city of Central Java.

Road Section
This toll road has been decided into 3 sections :

Section A has been connected straightly to Jakarta-Cikampek Toll Road since December 21, 2018. Section B also has been connected to Surabaya–Gempol Toll Road (turn left & right) & Waru-Juanda Toll Road (straightly), also since December 21, 2018. And the section C futurely will be connected to Surabaya-Gresik Toll Road.

Exits
Note: The number on the exits is based on the distance from the western terminus of the Jakarta-Cikampek Toll Road, while the distance numbers are based on the distance from the western terminus of this toll road only

Section A (Krapyak-Jatingaleh)

Section B (Srondol-Jatingaleh)

Section C (Jatingaleh-Kaligawe)

References

Toll roads in Indonesia
Transport in Central Java